12" Masters – Essential Mixes (commonly referred to as simply Essential Mixes) is a remix album by Australian pop singer Kylie Minogue. It was released on 17 September 2010, by Sony Music Entertainment. The album contains remixes of tracks from her 1994 and 1998 studio albums: Kylie Minogue and Impossible Princess.

Remixers who contribute to the album include Felix da Housecat, Trouser Enthusiasts, Quivver, Sash!, Justin Warfield, and TNT. Brothers in Rhythm, who produced her album Impossible Princess, also remixed the track "Too Far".

Track listing

References

External links 
 Kylie.com – Kylie Minogue official website

Kylie Minogue remix albums
2010 remix albums
2010 compilation albums
Albums produced by Dave Eringa